Nirmal Chandra Jain (24 September 1924 – 22 September 2003) was an Indian politician and a Senior Advocate. He was elected to the Lok Sabha the lower house of Indian Parliament from Seoni in Madhya Pradesh in 1977 as a member of the Janata Party. Later on, he became the Advocate General of M.P. Thereafter he continued his practice as a Senior Advocate. He then became the Member of Finance Commission of India. He was the Governor of Rajasthan in 2003.

References

External links
Official biographical sketch in Parliament of India website

1924 births
2003 deaths
India MPs 1977–1979
Governors of Rajasthan
Janata Party politicians
People from Jabalpur
Bharatiya Janata Party politicians from Madhya Pradesh
Lok Sabha members from Madhya Pradesh
Bharatiya Jana Sangh politicians